The Macavity Awards, established in 1987, are a literary award for mystery writers. Nominated and voted upon annually by the members of the Mystery Readers International, the award is named for the "mystery cat" of T. S. Eliot's Old Possum's Book of Practical Cats. The award is given in four categories—best novel, best first novel, best nonfiction, and best short story. The Sue Feder Historical Mystery has been given in conjunction with the Macavity Awards.

Best Mystery Novel

1980s

1990s

2000s

2010s

2020s

Best First Mystery (Novel)

1980s

1990s

2000s

2010s

2020s

Best Mystery Nonfiction/Critical 
This category has had multiple names since its inception and review the best mystery-related critical, biographical, and otherwise nonfiction titles.

1980s

1990s

2000s

2010s

2020s

Best Mystery Short Story

1980s

1990s

2000s

2010s

2020s

Sue Feder Memorial Award for Best Historical Mystery 
The Sue Feder Historical Mystery Award was established in 2006 to honor Sue Feder, "a reviewer, scholar and dedicated mystery fan, who had founded the [now defunct] Historical Mystery Appreciation Society."

2000s

2010s

2020s

References

External links
Home page of the Macavity award.

 
Mystery and detective fiction awards
Awards established in 1987
English-language literary awards